Bharti Sharma (born 15 October 1961), M.A. (Hindi) from Delhi University, National School of Drama Graduate (1987), is an Indian theater director, actor, and teacher. Her plays cover a variety of topics such as historical, realistic, experimental, plays based on man woman relationship, Indian mythological and philosophical themes.

Career
Sharma after graduating from the National School of Drama in 1987 founded the Kshitij Theater Group with Bipin Kumar and few other NSD graduates. She has acted in more than 50 plays and directed more than 35 plays. She has participated in many National and International Theater Festival like 8th Theater Olympics, Bharat Rang Mahotasav, Mohan Rakesh Samman Samaroh, Bhartendu Natya Utsav, Kathmandu International Theater Festival 2008, National Women Directors Theater Festival, Bhopal and Chandigarh, Sangeet Natak Theater Festival, Chandigarh, Odean Theatre Festival etc.

Stage dramatizations

Directing

Television and film

Awards
The screen play of the film Kaala Heera written by her was Zee TV's entry for best screen play in Asian T.V. and Film Awards in 2001. She has also been awarded with senior fellowship by Ministry of Culture, Govt. of India for her research work entitled "Changing Styles and Methods of Theater Acting".  She has been awarded the Best Actress Award by Natsamarat in 2013. She has been conferred JP Loknayak National Award 2020 for outstanding work in Hindi Theater., she is conferred with Zohra Sehgal National Raas Rang Samman, 2022 by the Raas Kala Manch, Safidon, Panipat

References

External links
 http://www.thehindu.com/entertainment/theatre/Between-gloom-and-glory/article16993881.ece
 http://epaper.bhaskar.com/bhopal/bhopal-city-bhaskar/124/08122017/mpcg/2/

 Bharti Sharma on instagram
 https://www.kshitijtheatregroup.com/about-1

Indian women theatre directors
Indian women dramatists and playwrights
Indian stage actresses
Living people
1961 births
Indian drama teachers
20th-century Indian actresses
21st-century Indian actresses
Recipients of the Sangeet Natak Akademi Award